Veendam is a town and municipality with a population of 27,752 in the province of Groningen in the northeast of the Netherlands. Veendam was established in 1648 as a peat colony by Adriaan Geerts Wildervanck.

A Holland America Line cruise ship, the MS Veendam, is named after the city.

The municipality includes Westerdiepsterdallen, the smallest town in the Netherlands.

Geography 
The population centres in the municipality are:

 Bareveld
 Borgercompagnie
 Kibbelgaarn
 Korte Akkers
 Numero Dertien
 Ommelanderwijk
 Tripscompagnie
 Veendam
 Wildervank
 Wildervanksterdallen
 Zuidwending

International relations 
Veendam has two sister cities:

Sports

Cycling 
Veendam was the start place of stage 4b at the 2012 Energiewacht Tour and the finish place of stage 2 at the 2013 Energiewacht Tour.

Sport clubs 
 SC Veendam, former soccer club
 Flash Veendam, volleyball club
 NNZC Veendam, gliding club

Notable residents 

 Hendrik de Cock (1801–1842) a Dutch minister responsible for the 1834 Dutch Reformed Church split 
 Anthony Winkler Prins (1817 in Voorst – 1908) a Dutch writer, chief editor of the Winkler Prins encyclopedia. 
 Herman Mees (1880–1964) was a Dutch artist, portrait painter, watercolorist and academic  
 Herman Johannes Lam (1892–1977) a Dutch botanist
 Addeke Hendrik Boerma (1912–1992) the first Executive Director of the World Food Programme 1962-1967
 Gerda Geertens  (born 1955 in Wildervank) a Dutch composer

Sport 
 Bert Romp (1958–2018) a Dutch equestrian, gold medallist at the 1992 Summer Olympics
 Janette Bouman (born 1964) a Dutch-born Kazakhstani dressage rider
 Rick Slor (born 1971) a retired professional footballer with 509 club caps
 Anneke Venema (born 1971) a retired rower, silver medallist at the 2000 Summer Olympics 
 Linda Moes (born 1971) a former breaststroke swimmer, competed at the 1988 Summer Olympics
 Peter Windt (born 1973) a Dutch former field hockey player
 Renate Groenewold (born 1976) a Dutch former long track speed skater, silver medallist at both the 2002 and the 2006 Winter Olympics 
 Henk Grol (born 1985 in Winschoten) a Dutch judoka, bronze medallist at both the 2008 and the 2012 Summer Olympics 
 Jeroen Zoet (born 1991) a Dutch professional football goalkeeper with over 250 club caps

Topography

References

External links 

 

 
Municipalities of Groningen (province)
Populated places in Groningen (province)
1648 establishments in the Dutch Republic